Shen Panwen (7 September 1916 – 4 July 2017) was a Chinese chemist.

Shen was born in September 1916 in Jilin City, Jilin, with his ancestral home in Conghua, Guangzhou and studied chemistry at National Southwestern Associated University. 

He taught at Nanjing University and was named an academician of the Chinese Academy of Sciences in 1980.

Death
Shen died at the age of 100 on 4 July 2017.

References

1916 births
2017 deaths
Chemists from Jilin
Chinese centenarians
Educators from Jilin
Members of the Chinese Academy of Sciences
Men centenarians
Academic staff of Nanjing University
National Southwestern Associated University alumni
People from Jilin City